Secret Service (also known as Secret Service: Ultimate Sacrifice) is a first-person shooter video game developed by Cauldron HQ and published by Activision for Microsoft Windows, PlayStation 2 and Xbox 360. It is set in Washington D.C. on Inauguration Day, where the player assumes the role of an elite agent named Pierce, whose task is to eliminate enemies to prevent them from attacking the Capitol. The game uses the CloakNT in-game engine.

Plot 
On the day of the Presidential inauguration Secret Service agent Pierce, a member of  current President Simon's personal detail, receives a phone call from an unknown caller who goes by the name "Semper"; Latin for "always" or "ever". He warns that the President is in danger and that someone at the top has compromised the Secret Service warning that "tyrants are everywhere".

Shortly thereafter, dozens of hostiles, although dressed like civilians, are all armed with AKs and speak Spanish, attack the Lincoln Memorial where President Simon is shot. After taking down several RPGs, President Simon is extracted to Walter Reed Medical Center.

Then reports of bombs planted in the Capitol building with over one hundred civilians trapped in the cross fire. Agent Pierce enters while another agent, Doyle, provides updates on situation. After Pierce disarms bombs the bomb squad is killed when they enter the building. He rescues a group of senators and questions the Speaker of the House about the vice president-elect, and learns that the president-elect and vice president-elect were political enemies.

Doyle then updates that the bombs were a setup for CVX bombs that would decimate D.C. and they originated from the fictional island of Costa Sentava; a military dictatorship led by a man named Vargas, who had used CVX gas before on his people during a revolt and also announced it was no longer in production. Doyle tells they had an inside man to not only get the gas in the country, but in the Capitol as well.

The soon to be US vice president is also leading the US delegation at the South American summit being held in D.C. Doyle and Pierce discuss about how they need to get to the White House to expose what's happening, Semper interjects implying the top level people he's going to talk to, could be the same top level people who could be behind the attacks.

Agent Pierce enters a network of tunnels that lead to the White House fighting the terrorists and the tunnel's automated defences. En route to the White House, Pierce is told to stand down on orders of Special Agent Kauffman, the man in charge of the Secret Service Protection Division, but later on while still in the tunnels, Pierce learns that President Simon died from his wounds. Doyle tells him that the President-elect detail has gone quiet as well.

After preventing an explosion in the tunnels, Pierce enters Secret Service-held territory. Pierce must fight, non-lethally, through Secret Service agents ordered to stop him because he has been classified as a rogue agent. After exiting the train depot chamber, Pierce eventually reach the White House, though he has to fight his way, both lethal and non-lethal, through both Costa Sentavans and the agents who, for unknown reasons, are with them. He also comes in radio contact with the loyal agents holed up inside the Oval Office with both the President-elect and Vice President.

When Pierce speaks to President-elect, Richards, and the Vice President William H. Fritz in the Oval Office, the Costa Sentavans attack the White House at night and Pierce must work with the remaining loyal agents to defend the complex before leaving for Andrews Air Force Base with the President on board Marine One, with the exception of the Vice President who has left behind to draw off enemy fire to allow the President to get away.

While on board Air Force One, Pierce is on the phone call with Semper that Davies is their main suspect as he was the ambassador to Costa Sentava for eight years before transitioning as a Senator. This proves true as Davies takes the President hostage with the rogue agents backing the corrupt Senator. Kauffman authorises Pierce to use lethal force against the agents in order to rescue the President and even remotely turning back Air Force One before terminating Davies for good.

Pierce and Doyle are both commentated by the President for all of their hard work and courage and they are hailed as heroes in their lives. Epilogue, Pierce and Semper contact once more and, though Semper decides not to reveal his own identity, he tells Pierce that he will be in touch soon.

Gameplay 
The gameplay is very similar to Die Hard: Vendetta, the James Bond games, and Soldier of Fortune: Payback. The game contains puzzle elements, where players must defuse bombs and unlock doors. It also uses the same reloading animations from Soldier of Fortune: Payback and 007: Agent Under Fire. For instance, the Uzi in this game has the same reload animation as the Ingalls Type 20 that appeared in the latter game. Weapons are given pseudonyms as well, for instance, the AK-103 is called the "KMF-03", and the Uzi is the only firearm with its actual name.

Reception 

Secret Service has received generally negative reviews. It has an aggregate score of 49.50% on GameRankings for the Xbox 360 version based on 4 reviews. IGN reviewer Charles Onyett awarded the Microsoft Windows and Xbox 360 version a 4.5 rating, praising some of the game's artificial intelligence for having a bit of challenge. However, Oynett pointed out the game's single-player campaign for being too short and not featuring a multiplayer mode.

See also 
 United States Secret Service

References

External links 
 Secret Service: Ultimate Sacrifice on IGN

2008 video games
First-person shooters
Video games developed in Slovakia
Windows games
PlayStation 2 games
Xbox 360 games
Video games about police officers
Video games set in Washington, D.C.